Richard Henry Estelle (born January 18, 1942) is a former Major League Baseball pitcher  who pitched for the San Francisco Giants in 1964 and 1965.

Estelle was inducted into the Lakewood High School Hall of Fame in 2006.

References

External links

Baseball players from New Jersey
Sportspeople from Lakewood Township, New Jersey
San Francisco Giants players
Salem Rebels players
Fresno Giants players
Major League Baseball pitchers
1942 births
Eugene Emeralds players
Springfield Giants players
Phoenix Giants players
Waterbury Giants players
Tacoma Giants players
Denver Bears players
Evansville Triplets players
Living people
Lakewood High School (New Jersey) alumni